The term dakshinachara ('right-hand path') is a technical term used to refer to tantric sects that do not engage in heterodox practices. In contrast, vamachara ('left-hand path') is  used to describe particular tantric practices that are considered heterodox according to usual Hindu social norms.

Etymology
N. N. Bhattacharyya explains the Sanskrit technical term  as follows:

The means of spiritual attainment which varies from person to person according to competence.... Ācāras are generally of seven kinds – Veda, Vaiṣṇava, Śaiva, Dakṣiṇa, Vāma, Siddhāṇta, and Kaula, falling into two broad categories – Dakṣiṇa and Vāma. Interpretations vary regarding the nature and grouping of the ācāras.

 means 'right'.  For this reason, the term dakṣiṇāra is often translated "right-hand path".

Practices
The Brahma Yamala, a tantric text, says there are three currents of tradition (dakshina, vama, and madhyama) characterized respectively by the predominance of each of the three gunas (sattva, rajas, and tamas).  According to this text, dakshina is characterized by sattva, and is pure; madhyama, characterized by rajas, is mixed; and vama, characterized by tamas, is impure.  The tantras of each class follow a particular line of spiritual practice. Dakshinachara consists of traditional Hindu practices such as asceticism and meditation.

See also

Notes

References

Hindu philosophical concepts
Hindu tantra
Tantric practices